"Sweetener" (stylized in all lowercase) is a song by American singer Ariana Grande from her fourth studio album of the same name, released in 2018. The song was written by Grande and its producer Pharrell Williams.

Background and release

It was written by Ariana Grande and Pharrell Williams who also handled the production. Grande's vocals were recorded by Sam Holland and Noah Passovoy at MXM Studios in Los Angeles, California, with Jeremy Lertola providing recording engineer assistance. Phill Tan mixed the track, and Josh Cadwin was the audio engineer, with Andrew Coleman and Mark Larson as the recording engineer. Randy Merrill later mastered the song at Sterling Sound in New York City, New York.
 
The song was first teased in Grande's "No Tears Left to Cry" music video, along with other songs. Grande posted a picture of herself listening to the song on her instagram story. On July 21, 2018, a paparazzo leaked a snippet of Grande playing the song in her car, later that day Grande confirmed the snippet on her Twitter.

Composition and lyrics

"Sweetener" runs for a total duration of three minutes and twenty-eight seconds (3:28). The song was one of the first Grande wrote for Sweetener. Lyrically, the song talks about self care and empowerment while she sings directly for her lover. It contains double entendres in the song as well. According to the sheet music published at Musicnotes.com by Universal Music Publishing Group, the song is composed in the key of E Major with a tempo of 120 beats per minute. Grande's vocals range from the note of F♯3 to D5.

The New York Times Jon Pareles wrote, "The sacred-secular juxtapositions continue in the title song, a Pharrell Williams production that switches between gospelly piano chords — as Ms. Grande praises how her man can 'bring the bitter taste to a halt' — and more dissonant hip-hop as she enjoys how 'you make me say 'oh!." Taylor Weatherby of Billboard called the song "'90s-inspired". The Guardian Alexis Petridis said, "the title track offers a bizarre, gripping splice of earthy Carole King-ish singer-songwriter piano ballad with Migos-inspired hip-hop, complete with onomatopoeic vocal interjections". Spencer Kornhaber of The Atlantic said the song "gutsily blends the sensibilities of commencement speeches with that of Lil Pump".Critical reception
"Sweetener" received positive reception from music critics. Brittany Spanos of Rolling Stone called the song a "bouncy, almost wickedly catchy highlight" on the album. In his review of the album, NME Douglas Greenwood wrote, "There's a telling audacity to the title track. Arriving midway through the album, 'Sweetener' sees Grande sing effervescently about 'letting the sweetener in our hearts' to 'bring that bitterness to a halt', before she ushers in a trap breakdown thats sounds like Metro Boomin messing with The Little Mermaid soundtrack." Chris DeVille of Stereogum said, "The title track is the sort of modernized throwback soul tune Meghan Trainor might release, but rendered tastefully and produced with the detail-rich minimalism of Spoon's Kill the Moonlight."

Pitchfork ranked it on its 100 best songs of 2018 list, saying that "amid the track’s svelte production — trickling percussion, cushy bass hits, a lusty and cascading synth line — Pharrell punctuates Grande’s commands with a high-pitched “sheesh!” like a steam whistle cutting through the air. It all adds up to a gleeful evocation of sensuality on an album consumed with the heady pleasures of new love. “Sweetener” carries a tender streak, too, embracing the notion of finding the good in so much bad, and toasting to the people in one’s life who encourage such perseverance. It embodies that same look-on-the-bright-side universality — a reminder that even the worst feelings can be turned into something radiant and nourishing."

Commercial performance
The song debuted on September 1, 2018 at number 55 at its peak position, being Grande's second highest-charting non-single in the US. After "Breathin" was released as the third single off Sweetener, it became Grande's highest-charting non-single in the US, later beaten by "Needy".

Live performances

Grande debuted the song live at The Sweetener Sessions in 2018. The song was later performed during the Sweetener World Tour in 2019.

Credits and personnel
Credits and personnel adapted from the liner notes of Sweetener''.

Recording
 Recorded at Chalice Recording Studios (Hollywood, California), East West Studios (Hollywood, California), Glenwood Place Studios (Burbank, California), The Lunchtable (Los Angeles, California) and Conway Recording Studios (Los Angeles, California)
 Mixed at Callanwolde Fine Arts Center (Atlanta, Georgia)
 Mastered at Sterling Sound (New York City, New York)

Management
 Published by EMI Pop Music Publishing/More Water from Nazareth (GMR), Universal Music Corp./GrandAri Music (ASCAP)

Personnel

 Ariana Grande – songwriting, vocals, vocal arrangement
 Pharrell Williams – songwriting, production, additional vocals
 Andrew Coleman – recording, digital editing and arrangement for I Am Other Entertainment
 Mike Larson – recording, digital editing and arrangement for I Am Other Entertainment
 Thomas Cullison – recording assistant
 David Kim – recording assistant
 Chris Khan – recording assistant
 Jacob Dennis – recording assistant
 Ian Findlay – recording assistant
 Ben "Bengineer" Sedano – recording assistant
 Phil Tan – mixing
 Bill Zimmerman – additional mix engineering
 Randy Merrill – mastering

Charts

Certifications

See also
 Pharrell Williams production discography

References

External links
 

2018 songs
American hip hop songs
American soul songs
Ariana Grande songs
Song recordings produced by Pharrell Williams
Songs written by Ariana Grande
Songs written by Pharrell Williams